Bottura is a surname. Notable people with the surname include:

Massimo Bottura (born 1962), Italian restaurateur, chef, and cookbook writer
Oprando Bottura (1896–1961), Italian javelin thrower

Italian-language surnames